Luke Dorn (born 2 July 1982) is an Australian former professional rugby league footballer who played as a  and  in the NRL and the Super League in the 2000s and 2010s.

He played for the Northern Eagles, Manly-Warringah Sea Eagles and the Sydney Roosters in the National Rugby League. He played for the London Broncos, Salford City Reds, Harlequins RL and the Castleford Tigers (Heritage № 882) in two separate spells in the European Super League.

Background
Dorn was born in Maitland, New South Wales, Australia, and played junior rugby league for the East Maitland Griffins and Morpeth Bulls. He represented the Australian Schoolboys team in 2000 whilst attending Maitland All Saints College.

Playing career
Dorn made his first grade debut for the Northern Eagles in round 4 of the 2002 NRL season.  He played in the club's final game in round 26 of the same year when they lost to Penrith 68–28.  The following year, the Northern Eagles reverted to Manly and Dorn played in their first game back in the competition, a 20–30 loss against North Queensland at Dairy Farmers Stadium. 

In 2005 he moved to the Super League competition, joining the London Broncos, scoring 23 tries in 28 games in his first season and developing a reputation as a prolific try scorer. In 2007 Dorn moved to the Salford City Reds, but was less successful and the team was relegated at the end of the season. Dorn then joined the Castleford Tigers in 2008, scoring 19 tries in 26 games, before returning to the London Broncos (then known as Harlequins RL) in 2009. In total Dorn played for the London Broncos 160 times in two spells, becoming the club's all-time record try scorer with 104 tries. He scored his 100th try for the Broncos in a spell where he scored eight tries in two back to back games.

At the end of 2013, Dorn signed for the Castleford Tigers for a second time. Castleford coach, Daryl Powell, said of him: "Luke is a player I have admired for a long time, his ability to play at half-back or full-back is massive and his leadership qualities and experience make him a key recruitment for us next season."

He enjoyed a career resurgence in 2014 and appeared in the 2014 Challenge Cup Final defeat by the Leeds Rhinos at Wembley Stadium, his first major final.

The following year, he signed a one-year extension to his contract. He played only 14 times in the 2015 season due to injuries, scoring ten tries. Dorn retired from Super League Rugby at the end of the 2016 season and returned to Australia. He played for Maitland Pickers in 2017, becoming player-coach for the 2018 season before retiring from playing at the end of the year.

Statistics

References

External links
Cas Tigers profile
Harlequins Rugby League profile
Statistics at thecastlefordtigers.co.uk

1982 births
Living people
Australian rugby league players
Australian expatriate sportspeople in England
Castleford Tigers players
London Broncos players
Maitland Pickers players
Manly Warringah Sea Eagles players
Northern Eagles players
Rugby league five-eighths
Rugby league fullbacks
Rugby league halfbacks
Rugby league players from Maitland, New South Wales
Salford Red Devils players
Sydney Roosters players